Spyros Andriopoulos (born 1 August 1962 in Patras) is a retired Greek marathon and long-distance runner. He competed in the Marathon run at the 1996 Summer Olympics, where he placed 36th with a time of 2:19.41. He still holds  the Greek national records in 10,000 metres, Half marathon and Marathon.

International competitions

References

1962 births
Living people
Athletes from Patras
Greek male marathon runners
Greek male long-distance runners
Athletes (track and field) at the 1996 Summer Olympics
Olympic athletes of Greece
Mediterranean Games bronze medalists for Greece
Athletes (track and field) at the 1987 Mediterranean Games
Universiade silver medalists in athletics (track and field)
Mediterranean Games medalists in athletics
Universiade silver medalists for Greece
Medalists at the 1987 Summer Universiade
20th-century Greek people